Kamen is a rural locality (a settlement) in Yayvinskoye Urban Settlement, Alexandrovsky District, Perm Krai, Russia. The population was 103 as of 2010. There are 7 streets.

Geography 
Kamen is located 61 km north of Alexandrovsk (the district's administrative centre) by road. Baza is the nearest rural locality.

References 

Rural localities in Alexandrovsky District